Mihael Zmajlović (born 19 January 1978) is a Croatian economist and politician who served as a minister at Ministry of Environmental Protection and Nature at the Cabinet of Zoran Milanović from 2012 until 2016, had previously served as mayor of Jastrebarsko from 2009 until 2012. He is a member of the centre-left Social Democratic Party of Croatia.

Education
Zmajlović finished elementary school "Ljubo Babić" in Jastrebarsko and 15th Gymnasium in Zagreb. He graduated from the University of Zagreb Faculty of Economics where he also gained his PhD in year 2008.

Since 2010, Zmajlović is a member of the Presidium of the Association of Croatian cities and chairman of the local action group "Jana". In 2012 he was briefly a member of the board of the Fund for Environmental Protection and Energy Efficiency.

Political career
Zmajlović is a member of the Social Democratic Party since 2005. In the same year, he was elected president of the Jastrebarsko city organization of the Party. Five years later he became president of the party organization of the Zagreb County.

In 2009 local elections, he was elected mayor of the City of Jastrebarsko. He served as mayor for three years. He was succeeded by his deputy Zvonimir Novosel.

In 2011 parliamentary elections, Zmajlović was elected to the Croatian Parliament from the list of Kukuriku coalition. He was president of the Committee for Physical Planning and Construction and member of the Committee for finance and state budget.

He became a member of the presidency of SDP at the Party convention in June 2012.

After the resignation of Mirela Holy as Minister of Environment and Nature Protection, at the proposal of Prime Minister Zoran Milanović, Zmajlović was elected minister on 13 June 2012.

Personal life
Zmajlović is married to Marija Zmajlović with whom he has two children. He speaks English, Italian and German.

References

1978 births
Living people
People from Jastrebarsko
Social Democratic Party of Croatia politicians
University of Zagreb alumni
Representatives in the modern Croatian Parliament